Turid Haaland (June 23, 1908 – October 12, 1979) was a Norwegian actress.

Haaland debuted in 1926 at the Norwegian Theater. She played the daughter in Runar Schildt's play Den store rolla, and the character's parents were played by her real parents, Mally Carenius Haaland and Ingjald Haaland, who were both actors. She was later mainly associated with the New Theater (and its successor, the Oslo New Theater), mainly in comedy roles, such as Nille in Jeppe på Bjerget.

Haaland was also active as a film actress. She made her debut in Familien på Borgan in 1939. She was particularly active on the screen in the 1950s, and she starred in several of Arne Skouen's films. She had one of the lead roles in Aldri annet enn bråk.

Haaland performed the voice of Karius in the animated film Karius og Baktus.

Filmography

1939: Familien på Borgan as Gurine Plassen
1941: Kjærlighet og vennskap as Hulda
1943: Vigdis as Nordby's sister
1949: Gategutter as Reidar's mother
1950: To mistenkelige personer	
1951: Kranes konditori as Mrs. Fosnes
1952: Nødlanding as the telephone operator's wife
1954: Aldri annet enn bråk as Hulda Bråten
1954: Cirkus Fandango as Carmen
1954: Karius og Baktus as Karius (voice)
1956: Gylne ungdom as Carl-Otto's mother
1956: Kvinnens plass as the mother
1957: På slaget åtte	
1957: Slalåm under himmelen as Mrs. Riesing
1958: Bustenskjold as Bernt's wife
1958: Pastor Jarman kommer hjem as the waitress
1975: Fru Inger til Østråt as the maid
1975: Glade vrinsk

References

External links
 
 Turid Haaland at the Swedish Film Database
 Turid Haaland at Filmfront
 Turid Haaland at Sceneweb

1908 births
1979 deaths
20th-century Norwegian actresses